is a passenger railway station located in Kawasaki-ku, Kawasaki, Kanagawa Prefecture, Japan, operated by East Japan Railway Company (JR East).

Lines

Station layout
The station consists of two side platforms approximately 50 m long serving two tracks on the otherwise single-track line. The platforms are separated by the Odasakae level crossing, with the down (Hama-Kawasaki-bound) platform located on the north-west (Shitte) side, and the up (Shitte-bound) platform on the south-east (Hama-Kawasaki) side.

Platforms

History
Details of the proposed station were announced by JR East in January 2015, with the station provisionally named . The name Odasakae was announced in September 2015.

The total construction cost of approximately 548 million yen was borne equally by JR East and the city of Kawasaki.The stationeries was opened on March 26, 2016.

From 1 October 2016, JR East has introduced station numbering in the Tokyo area, with Odasakae Station becoming "JN 53".

Passenger statistics
The station is expected to be used by an average of approximately 3,500 passengers daily.

Surrounding area
 Higashi-Oda Elementary School

See also
 List of railway stations in Japan

References

External links

 JR East station information 

Nambu Line
Stations of East Japan Railway Company
Railway stations in Kanagawa Prefecture
Railway stations in Japan opened in 2016